MDAI (5,6-methylenedioxy-2-aminoindane) is a drug developed in the 1990s by a team led by David E. Nichols at Purdue University. It acts as a non-neurotoxic and highly selective serotonin releasing agent (SSRA) in vitro and produces entactogen effects in humans.

Chemistry 

The chemical structure of MDAI is indirectly derived from that of the illicit drug MDA, but the alpha-methyl group of the alkyl amino amphetamine side chain has been bound back to the benzene nucleus to form an indane ring system, which changes its pharmacological properties substantially.

MDAI can be produced from 3-(3,4-methylenedioxyphenyl)propionic acid which is converted to the acid chloride and then heated to produce 5,6-Methylenedioxy-1-indanone.  Treatment of the indanone with amyl nitrite in methanol with HCl afforded the hydroxyimino ketone. This is reduced to the 2-aminoindan following a modification of Nichols' earlier method from a paper discussing DOM analogues, using a Pd/C catalyst in glacial acetic acid with catalytic H2SO4.

Pharmacology

MDAI has been shown to inhibit the reuptake of serotonin, dopamine, and norepinephrine with IC50 values of 512 nM, 5,920 nM, and 1,426 nM, respectively. This demonstrates that MDAI has selective affinity for the serotonin transporter (SERT). In animals treated with reserpine and MDAI, greater extracellular concentrations of monoamine neural transmitters resulted, most significantly serotonin. This result indicates that MDAI is a potent releaser of serotonin, while effectively inhibiting the reuptake of serotonin.  For comparison, MDAI is similar in potency with releasing serotonin to MDA but significantly less potent than MDMA.

Effects 

The family of drugs typified by MDMA produce their effects through multiple mechanisms of action in the body, and consequently produce three distinct cues which animals can be trained to respond to: a stimulant cue typified by drugs such as methamphetamine, a psychedelic cue typified by drugs such as LSD and DOM, and an "entactogen-like" cue which is produced by drugs such as MDAI and MBDB. These drugs cause drug-appropriate responses in animals trained to recognize the effects of MDMA, but do not produce responses in animals trained selectively to respond to stimulants or hallucinogens. Because these compounds selectively release serotonin in the brain but have little effect on dopamine or noradrenaline levels, they can produce empathogenic effects but without any stimulant action, instead being somewhat sedating.

Very high doses can be fatal in rats with a 50% fatality rate for those subcutaneously injected with 28 mg/kg of MDAI. This is a result of the way serotonin release interferes with thermoregulation.

Use in scientific research 

MDAI and other similar drugs have been widely used in scientific research, as they are able to replicate many of the effects of MDMA, but without causing the neurotoxicity which may be associated with MDMA and some related drugs. No tests have been performed on cardiovascular toxicity.

Use as a recreational drug
MDAI has been advertised as a designer drug. It started to be sold online from around 2007, but reached peak popularity between about 2010–2012, after bans on mephedrone came into effect in various countries. Internet-sourced products claimed to be MDAI have been shown variously to contain mephedrone or other substituted cathinone derivatives, and mixed compositions of inorganic substances, while generally containing no MDAI. The number of internet searches for MDAI has been considerably higher in the UK compared to Germany and the USA.  MDAI is only non-neurotoxic in isolation but may become neurotoxic when mixed with other drugs.  Three deaths were linked to MDAI use in the UK during 2011–2012, all involving symptoms consistent with serotonin syndrome. Two of these also involved other drugs while one death appeared to be from MDAI alone.

Legal Status

As of October 2015 MDAI is a controlled substance in China.

MDAI is illegal in Denmark as of September 2015.

As of December 2011 MDAI is a controlled substance in Switzerland

See also 
 MEAI
 C10H11NO2

References 

Entactogens and empathogens
Designer drugs
Serotonin releasing agents
Benzodioxoles